Michael Hawkins (26 November 1928 – 26 October 2014) was a British actor. Though rarely the star in any series or film in which he appeared, Hawkins appeared in supporting roles in dozens of productions over three decades.

His credits included parts in The Avengers, I, Claudius, George and Mildred, Doomwatch and the Doctor Who story Frontier in Space.

Hawkins retired in 1979 and died on 26 October 2014 at the age of 85.

Filmography

References

External links
 

1928 births
2014 deaths
English male film actors
English male television actors
Male actors from Bedfordshire